Lugo is a province of northwestern Spain, in the northeastern part of the autonomous community of Galicia. It is bordered by the provinces of Ourense, Pontevedra, and A Coruña, the principality of Asturias, the State of León, and in the north by the Cantabrian Sea (Bay of Biscay).

The population is 331,327 (2018), of whom a quarter live in the capital Lugo. The capital city was an ancient Celtic settlement named in honour of the god Lugh (see Lyon), later Latinised as Lucus Augusti, and which became one of the three main important Galician-Roman centres alongside Braccara Augusta and Asturica Augusta (modern Braga and Astorga respectively). The province has 67 municipalities.

Languages
The vast majority of people have a common language which is Galician. Some people, especially the older generation, are monolingual and only speak Galician. There are only a few people bilingual  in Galician and Castilian of the little over 10,000 inhabitants. Even in the capital, the vitality of the Galician language in conversation is very strong.

The inhabitants speak several variants of Galician in the province of Lugo. They have the characteristics of being the closest to León isoglosses and therefore also the Castilian language. So they have some grammatical and phonetic signs that are mistakenly considered influences of the Castilian or Leonese languages. However, the language of Galicia in Lugo, especially in non-coastal areas, is probably the most genuine in Galicia, due to almost no historic pressure  of Castilian exercised on the rural population.

Population
The historical population is given in the following chart:

Geography

Estuaries
The estuaries of the Lugo province are part of the Atlas estuaries. From west to east they are:
O Barqueiro estuary
Viveiro estuary
Foz estuary
Ribadeo estuary

Rivers
Miño river
Sil river
Landro river
Ouro river
Masmo river

Municipalities

References

See also
List of municipalities in Lugo
Galician wine